Big Black River Railroad Bridge is a  concrete open-spandrel arch bridge over the Big Black River built in 1917 near Bovina, Mississippi.  It spans the river between Warren County and Hinds County; the nearest settlements are Bovina (in Warren) and Edwards, Mississippi (in HInds).

It was listed on the National Register of Historic Places in 1988.  According to its listing in the Mississippi Historic Bridge Survey in 1988, it is significant as the largest and "most impressive" concrete open-spandrel bridge in Mississippi (out of just two in the state).

Open-spandrel concrete arch bridges were built in the early 1900s in areas where concrete was not too expensive relative to alternatives and where the span would be sufficiently high so that the arch could span the requisite distance. (Truss bridges can be built lower.)

See also
Big Black River Battlefield

References

Railroad bridges on the National Register of Historic Places in Mississippi
Bridges completed in 1917
Illinois Central Railroad
National Register of Historic Places in Hinds County, Mississippi
Concrete bridges in the United States
Open-spandrel deck arch bridges in the United States